KinK was a Canadian documentary television series, which first aired in 2001 on Showcase. The series profiled some of the more unusual edges of human sexuality, primarily the kink and fetish scenes. It was filmed in Montreal, Toronto, Vancouver and Winnipeg; the fifth season, set in Halifax, Nova Scotia, first aired in September 2006. KinK was produced by Vancouver's Paperny Films.

The series' official website and home video releases are no longer available after Paperny Entertainment's parent company Entertainment One was acquired by Hasbro in December 2019.

Concept
This series highlights different people's real-life kinks, as defined by the person being observed. Each episode takes an in-depth look at the lifestyles of two or three people (or couples), and how their kink affects their life. Each season of the show follows these couples as they learn and progress through the lifestyle.

Seasons
 2001  13 x 30 min (Showcase)
 2002  13 x 30 min (Showcase)
 2003  13 x 30 min (Showcase)
 2005  11 x 30 min (Showcase)
 2006  13 x 30 min (Showcase)

See also
 BDSM
 Bondage
 Cross-dressing
 Polyamory
 Restraints
 Sadomasochism
 Sexual fetishism
 Sexual roleplay
 Transgender
 Transsexualism
 Transvestism

External links
 KINKonDVD
 
 Paperny Films
 Friends, neighbours shock in 'Kink', Winnipeg Sun

2001 Canadian television series debuts
BDSM-related mass media
Fetish subculture
Showcase (Canadian TV channel) original programming
2000s Canadian documentary television series
Television series by Entertainment One